Tiago Emanuel Embaló Djaló (9 April 2000) is a Portuguese professional footballer who plays for French club Lille mainly as a central defender but also as a full-back.

Club career

Sporting CP
Djaló was born in Amadora, Lisbon metropolitan area to Bissau-Guinean parents, and he joined Sporting CP's academy in 2013 from Sport Futebol Damaiense. On 24 February 2018, still a junior, he made his professional debut in the LigaPro with their reserves, playing 74 minutes in a 2–2 home draw against Académica de Coimbra.

On 11 April 2018, Djaló scored his first goal in the second division, closing the 1–1 home draw with Famalicão.

Milan
In January 2019, Djaló was signed by A.C. Milan as his contract with Sporting was about to expire. In July, alongside several other youth team players, he was invited to train with the first team by the newly appointed coach Marco Giampaolo. He appeared in his only match for the club in a friendly with Novara, coming on as a second-half substitute.

Lille
Djaló joined Lille on 1 August 2019 on a five-year deal, for an undisclosed fee reported to be within the area of €5 million. He made his debut in the French Ligue 1 ten days later, starting in central defence alongside his compatriot José Fonte in the 2–1 home victory over Nantes. He first appeared in the UEFA Champions League on 23 October, featuring 87 minutes in a 1–1 draw against Valencia in the group stage also at the Stade Pierre-Mauroy.

In the 2020–21 season, Djaló contributed 17 games to help his team win the national championship for the first time since 2011. On 1 August, he started as Lille won the Trophée des Champions 1–0 against Paris Saint-Germain at Bloomfield Stadium in Tel Aviv, Israel. He scored his first league goal on 6 November that year, opening an eventual 1–1 home draw with Angers.

International career
Djaló won 24 caps for Portugal at youth level. His first for the under-21 side occurred on 14 November 2019, in a 0–0 friendly draw against Slovenia held in Estoril.

On 21 March 2022, Djaló received his first call-up to the senior squad, after Pepe tested positive for COVID-19 ahead of the 2022 FIFA World Cup qualification play-offs against Turkey. In October, he was named in a preliminary 55-man squad for the finals in Qatar.

Honours
Lille
Ligue 1: 2020–21
Trophée des Champions: 2021

References

External links

2000 births
Living people
People from Amadora
Portuguese sportspeople of Bissau-Guinean descent
Sportspeople from Lisbon District
Black Portuguese sportspeople
Portuguese footballers
Association football defenders
Liga Portugal 2 players
Sporting CP B players
A.C. Milan players
Ligue 1 players
Lille OSC players
Portugal youth international footballers
Portugal under-21 international footballers
Portuguese expatriate footballers
Expatriate footballers in Italy
Expatriate footballers in France
Portuguese expatriate sportspeople in Italy
Portuguese expatriate sportspeople in France